Palanka can refer to:

Places
 Palanka, Brčko District, Bosnia and Herzegovina
 Palanka, Gračac, Lika, Croatia
 Kriva Palanka Municipality, North Macedonia
 Kriva Palanka
 Palanca, Bacău (Hungarian: Palánka), Western Moldavia, Romania
 Bačka Palanka, Vojvodina, Serbia
 Banatska Palanka, Vojvodina, Serbia
 Bela Palanka, Pirot, Serbia
 Brza Palanka, Bor, Serbia
 Smederevska Palanka, Podunavlje, Serbia
 Byala Palanka, Tvarditsa Municipality, Bulgaria
 Palanka, a territorial district within the organization of Zaporozhian Cossacks, Ukraine
 Palanka, Pennsylvania, a place in Pennsylvania, U.S.

Other uses
 Palanka (fortification), a wooden fortification used by the Ottoman Empire and the eponym of numerous aforementioned toponyms
 Palanka (film), a 1975 Bengali film
 Palanka, a character in the Practical Chinese Reader, used for teaching Mandarin Chinese
 Kriva Palanka dialect, one of the northern dialects of Macedonian

See also

 Palanca (disambiguation)
 Palanko, a village in Togo
 Pálinka, a fruit spirit